Bath Haji Absalam (Azerbaijani - Hacı Əbu-Salam hamamı ) - is an old bathhouse located in the village of Pirşağı in the Sabunchu district of Baku, Azerbaijan. This is one of the most famous places in the settlement. This building, known as "Sand Bath" among the local population, was built by Haji Shahverdi Shahverdizadeh, a resident of the settlement. It is noted that the bath belongs to the 19th century, Haji Shahverdi built this bath together with his son Mashadi Sadiq Shahverdizade.

Origin of ritual 
People have always considered baths as a place of comfort, cleanliness, vitality, health, spiritual peace, relaxation, and renewal of the soul. Rituals that people always perform historically: bathing, washing with water have become the main condition of physical cleanliness.

History 
The bathhouse was built in 1901-1902. It belonged to Kerbalai Abusalamoglu. In plan, the building is an elongated rectangle. The premises of the bath are located in one row, while the entrance in the form of a portal is located in the corner of the long facade. 

Vugar Shahverdizadeh, one of the grandsons of Mashadi Sadiq Bey , told Okhu.Az that when his grandfather built this bath, he also thought about the residents of the settlement: 

Arzu Farzaliyeva, granddaughter of Mashadi Sadiq, one of the builders of the historical bath, told Okhu.Az that there are many mysterious aspects about the bath: 

According to the order of the Cabinet of Ministers of the Republic of Azerbaijan on historical and cultural monuments, the bathhouse is a "monument of history and culture of local importance".

Currently, the bathhouse is located in the courtyard of the former pioneer camp "Lokomotiv". Next to the bath there is a bust of Kerbalai Abusalamoglu. According to the instructions of President Ilham Aliyev, since 2019, special improvement works have been started in the settlements of Baku city and Absheron region.

References

Monuments and memorials in Azerbaijan